Qatana District is a district of the Rif Dimashq Governorate in southern Syria.

The district is located just to the east of Mount Hermon. Administrative centre is the city of Qatana. At the 2004 census, the district had a population of 207,245.

Sub-districts
The district of Qatana is divided into three sub-districts or nawāḥī (population as of 2004):

Localities in Qatana District
According to the Central Bureau of Statistics (CBS), the following villages, towns and cities make up the district of Qatana:

References

 

 
Districts of Rif Dimashq Governorate